The 1957–58 William & Mary Indians men's basketball team represented the College of William & Mary in intercollegiate basketball during the 1957–58 NCAA University Division men's basketball season. Under the first year of head coach Bill Chambers, the team finished the season 15–14, 9–9 in the Southern Conference. This was the 53rd season of the collegiate basketball program at William & Mary, whose nickname is now the Tribe. William & Mary played its home games at Blow Gymnasium.

The Indians finished in 6th place in the conference and qualified for the 1958 Southern Conference men's basketball tournament, held at the Richmond Arena. In a surprising run, William & Mary defeated #2 VPI in the quarterfinals and #3 George Washington in the semifinals before losing in the championship game to top-seeded West Virginia. This was the first of eight times that the Indians played in the championship game of a conference tournament.

Program notes
William & Mary played two teams for the first time this season: Evansville and Murray State.
William & Mary's appearance in the Southern Conference championship game would be the first of nine such appearances (the others came in 1961, 1965, 1975, 1983, 2008, 2010, 2014, and 2015). 
On February 10, the Indians played their first-ever game against a team ranked #1 in the AP poll, losing 68–82 at West Virginia.
Roy Lange was named to the first team all-Southern Conference.

Schedule

|-
!colspan=9 style="background:#006400; color:#FFD700;"| Regular season

|-
!colspan=9 style="background:#006400; color:#FFD700;"| 1958 Southern Conference Basketball Tournament

Source

References

William & Mary Tribe men's basketball seasons
William and Mary Indians
William and Mary Indians Men's Basketball Team
William and Mary Indians Men's Basketball Team